A bus station or a bus interchange is a structure where city or intercity buses stop to pick up and drop off passengers. While the term  bus depot can also be used to refer to a bus station, it generally refers to a bus garage. A bus station is larger than a bus stop, which is usually simply a place on the roadside, where buses can stop. It may be intended as a terminal station for a number of routes, or as a transfer station where the routes continue.

Bus station platforms may be assigned to fixed bus lines, or variable in combination with a dynamic passenger information system. The latter requires fewer platforms, but does not supply the passenger the comfort of knowing the platform well in advance and waiting there.

Accessible station
An accessible station is a public transportation passenger station which provides ready access, is usable and does not have physical barriers that prohibit and/or restrict access by people with disabilities, including those who use wheelchairs.

Largest bus stations

At , the Chennai Mofussil Bus Terminus in Chennai, India, is the largest bus station in Asia.

The Woodlands Bus Interchange in Singapore is one of the busiest bus interchanges in the world, handling up to 400,000 passengers daily across 42 bus services. Other bus interchanges such as Bedok, Tampines and Yishun handle similar number of passengers daily.

The largest underground bus station in Europe is Kamppi Centre of Helsinki, Finland completed in 2006. The terminal cost 100 million Euro to complete and took 3 years to design and build. Today, the bus terminal, which covers 25,000 square meters, is the busiest bus terminal in Finland. Every day, the terminal has around 700 bus departures, transporting some 170,000 passengers.

Preston Bus Station in Preston, Lancashire, built in 1969 and later heritage-listed, was described in 2014 as "depending on how you measure it, the largest bus station in the world, the second-biggest in Europe, and the longest in Europe". It was fully refurbished in 2018.

The largest bus terminal in North America is the Port Authority Bus Terminal located in Manhattan, New York City. The terminal is located in Midtown at 625 Eighth Avenue between 40th Street and 42nd Street, one block east of the Lincoln Tunnel and one block west of Times Square. The terminal is the largest in the Western Hemisphere and the busiest in the world by volume of traffic, serving about 8,000 buses and 225,000 people on an average weekday and more than 65 million people a year. It has 223 gates. It operates intercity bus routes all over the United States and some international destinations mostly in Canada which most of them are operated by Greyhound Lines.

The largest bus terminal in the southern hemisphere is the Tietê Bus Terminal located in São Paulo, Brazil. It is also the 2nd busiest in the world, serving about 90,000 people per weekday in 300 bus lines on its 89 platforms (72 for boarding and 17 for deboarding), with services to over 1,000 cities over the country and South America. The terminal is also connected to an adjacent metro station.

See also

 Bus depot (bus garage)
 Bus stop
 Bus terminus
 Bus Interchange (New Zealand)
Bus Stations (Singapore)
 Intermodal passenger transport
 Railway station
 Ticket (admission)

References